Sarah Manguso (born 1974) is an American writer and poet. In 2007, she was awarded the Joseph Brodsky Rome Prize Fellowship in literature by the American Academy of Arts and Letters. Her memoir The Two Kinds of Decay (2008), was named an "Editors’ Choice" title by the New York Times Sunday Book Review and a 2008 "Best Nonfiction Book of the Year" by the San Francisco Chronicle. Her book Ongoingness: The End of a Diary (2015) was also named a New York Times "Editors’ Choice." Her debut novel, Very Cold People, was published by Penguin in 2022.

Life
She was born and raised near Boston, Massachusetts. Manguso received her B.A. from Harvard University and her M.F.A. from the Iowa Writers' Workshop. She has taught creative writing at the Pratt Institute and in the graduate program at The New School. She lives in Los Angeles, and teaches in the MFA program at Antioch University and New England College.

Her poems and prose have appeared in Harper's, the New York Times Magazine, and The Paris Review. Her poems have appeared in four editions of the Best American Poetry series.

Awards and honors
2012: Salon What To Read Awards, The Guardians
2012: Guggenheim Fellowship
2011: Wellcome Trust Book Prize, shortlist, The Two Kinds of Decay
2008: Rome Prize
2003: Hodder Fellowship

Published works
Prose
Very Cold People (Penguin, 2022)
300 Arguments (Graywolf, 2017)
Ongoingness: The End of a Diary (Graywolf, 2015)
The Guardians: An Elegy (Farrar, Straus & Giroux, 2012)
The Two Kinds of Decay (Farrar, Straus & Giroux, 2008)
Hard to Admit and Harder to Escape (McSweeney's Books, 2007)

Poetry
Siste Viator (Four Way Books, 2006)
The Captain Lands in Paradise (Alice James Books, 2002)

References

External links
 Alice James Books > Author Page > Sarah Manguso
Author's Official Website
The Writer's Almanac with Garrison Keillor > What We Miss by Sarah Manguso
 Audio Interview: WNYC Radio > The Leonard Lopate Show: Surviving a Major Illness > 09/05/08

1974 births
Living people
Harvard University alumni
University of Iowa alumni
Writers from Massachusetts
Writers from New York (state)
American women poets
21st-century American women